Alessandro Prampolino (1827–1865) was an Italian landscape painter. He is known chiefly by his views (vedute) of the neighbourhood of Tivoli and of the Roman Ruins. He was professor of painting in his native Reggio.

References

19th-century Italian painters
Italian male painters
Italian landscape painters
Painters of ruins
People from Reggio Emilia
1827 births
1865 deaths
19th-century Italian male artists